Mowrer is the surname of the following people:
Edgar Ansel Mowrer (1892–1977), American journalist and author 
Gordon Mowrer (1936–2016), American politician, businessman, and ordained pastor
Nick Mowrer (born 1988), American sport shooter 
Orval Hobart Mowrer (1907–1982), American psychologist 
Paul Scott Mowrer (1887–1971), American newspaper correspondent